Kulyk is a Ukrainian-language surname.

Ivan Kulyk (bishop), a Ukrainian Greek-Catholic bishop
Liliya Kulyk, Ukrainian triple jumper
Oleh Kulyk, secular name of Patriarch Moses of the Ukrainian Autocephalous Orthodox Church
Sergiy V. Kulyk (born 1958), Ukrainian diplomat

See also
 

Ukrainian-language surnames
Surnames of Ukrainian origin
Slavic-language surnames